Yoav Bruck (born March 6, 1972, in Lakhish) is a former swimmer from Israel, who competed in three Summer Olympics for his native country, starting in 1992.

Bruck is Jewish.  He finished 32nd in the 50m freestyle (23.72) and 31st in the 100m freestyle (51.46) in the 1992 Summer Olympics in Barcelona.

At the 1997 Maccabiah Games, he won gold medals in the 50-meter freestyle and 100-meter freestyle.

In 2013 Bruck served as the Sports Chairman for the 2013 Maccabiah Games in Israel.

At the 2017 Maccabiah Games, in the special 4x50m relay race between Israeli and American all-star teams, American Olympic champions Lenny Krayzelburg (four Olympic golds), Jason Lezak (four Olympic golds), and Anthony Ervin (three Olympic golds), with masters swimmer Alex Blavatnik, swam a time of 1:48.23 and defeated Israeli Olympians Bruck, Guy Barnea, Eran Groumi, and Tal Stricker, who had a time of 1:51.25.

See also
List of select Jewish swimmers

References

External links
 

1972 births
Living people
Auburn Tigers men's swimmers
Israeli expatriates in the United States
Israeli Jews
Israeli male swimmers
Jewish swimmers
Olympic swimmers of Israel
People from Ashkelon
Swimmers at the 1992 Summer Olympics
Swimmers at the 1996 Summer Olympics
Swimmers at the 2000 Summer Olympics
Maccabiah Games medalists in swimming
Maccabiah Games gold medalists for Israel
Competitors at the 1997 Maccabiah Games